Thelairochaetona is a genus of parasitic flies in the family Tachinidae.

Species
Thelairochaetona thrix Townsend, 1919

Distribution
Panama

References

Exoristinae
Diptera of North America
Tachinidae genera
Taxa named by Charles Henry Tyler Townsend